The 2011 NBL season was the 30th season of the National Basketball League. In 2011, the Auckland Pirates debuted in the league but the Christchurch Cougars did not take part due to the effects of the 2011 Canterbury earthquake. The Harbour Heat also did not compete in the 2011 season, leaving the total number of teams at nine.

The regular season commenced on Wednesday 13 April with the Auckland Pirates hosting the Otago Nuggets at ASB Stadium in Auckland. Six teams qualified for the NBL Playoffs, with the third and fourth seeds hosting quarterfinal games against the sixth and fifth seeds, respectively, on Tuesday 12 July. The winners then joined the first and second seeds at the final four weekend. Wellington's waterfront TSB Bank Arena hosted the 2011 NBL Final Four, with two semifinals on Friday 15 July and the championship game on Sunday 17 July.

Team information

Summary

Regular season standings

Playoff bracket

Awards

Player of the Week

Statistics leaders
Stats as of the end of the regular season

Regular season
 Most Valuable Player: Alex Pledger (Waikato Pistons)
 NZ Most Valuable Player: Alex Pledger (Waikato Pistons)
 Most Outstanding Guard: Lindsay Tait (Wellington Saints)
 Most Outstanding NZ Guard: Lindsay Tait (Wellington Saints)
 Most Outstanding Forward: Alex Pledger (Waikato Pistons)
 Most Outstanding NZ Forward/Centre: Alex Pledger (Waikato Pistons)
 Scoring Champion: Jack Leasure (Taranaki Mountainairs)
 Rebounding Champion: Nick Horvath (Manawatu Jets)
 Assist Champion: Jason Crowe (Waikato Pistons)
 Rookie of the Year: Steven Adams (Wellington Saints)
 Coach of the Year: Dean Vickerman (Waikato Pistons)
 All-Star Five:
 G: Lindsay Tait (Wellington Saints)
 G: Jason Crowe (Waikato Pistons)
 F: Thomas Abercrombie (Waikato Pistons)
 F: Mika Vukona (Nelson Giants)
 C: Alex Pledger (Waikato Pistons)

Playoffs
 Finals MVP: Lindsay Tait (Wellington Saints)

References

External links
 Basketball New Zealand 2011 Results Annual
 2011 QF Results
 2011 Grand Final Preview
 Saints win
 2011 crowd numbers

National Basketball League (New Zealand) seasons
NBL